Tavil Deraz (also Romanized as Ţavīl Derāz; also known as Tavez Darāz and Tūz Devāz) is a village in Cheghapur Rural District, Kaki District, Dashti County, Bushehr Province, Iran. At the 2006 census, its population was 33, in 9 families.

References 

Populated places in Dashti County